Ferdinando Colaninno (born 24 January 1967) is an Italian former yacht racer who competed in the 2000 Summer Olympics.

References

1967 births
Living people
Italian male sailors (sport)
Olympic sailors of Italy
Sailors at the 2000 Summer Olympics – Star